The elections for Oxford City Council took place on 5 May 2016. This was on the same day as other local elections. As Oxford City Council is elected by halves, one seat in each of the 24 wards is up for election.

Overall turnout was 39.2%. The highest turnout was 53.9% for Iffley Fields, and the lowest 18.6% for Northfield Brook.

Results

Note: two UKIP candidates stood in this election, compared with six in 2014 and three in 2012. Three independent candidates were standing, compared with four in 2014 and one in 2012. Plus/minus percentages are calculated with respect to the 2014 Oxford City Council election.

Total number of seats on the council after the election:

Results by ward

Barton and Sandhills

 +6.8

Blackbird Leys

Carfax

Churchill

Cowley

Cowley Marsh

Headington

Headington Hill and Northway

Hinksey Park

Holywell

Iffley Fields

Jericho and Osney

Littlemore

Lye Valley

Marston

North

Northfield Brook

Quarry and Risinghurst

Rose Hill and Iffley

St Clement's

St Margaret's

St Mary's

Summertown

Wolvercote

Source: "Election of City Councillors for the Wards of Summary of Results", Oxfordshire County Council, 28 June 2016.

Party share of vote map

References

2016 English local elections
2016
2010s in Oxford